Fähnrich, Fahnrich or Faehnrich is a surname. Notable people with the surname include:

Heinz Fähnrich, German Caucasologist (:de:Heinz Fähnrich)
Gabriele Fähnrich (born 1968), East German gymnast

German-language surnames